Iron Mountain Mine, also known as the Richmond Mine at Iron Mountain, is a mine near Redding in Northern California, US. Geologically classified as a "massive sulfide ore deposit", the site was mined for iron, silver, gold, copper, zinc, quartz, and pyrite intermittently from the 1860s until 1963. The mine is the source of extremely acidic mine drainage which also contains large amounts of zinc, copper and cadmium. One of America's most toxic waste sites, it has been listed as a federal Superfund site since 1983.

History 
It became known as Pumptown later to be known  as Buckeye all three partners sold their claims to Quartz Hill Gold mining company, based in Cook County Illinois. During its high point over two hundred stamp mills were under production, the site was mined by the Mountain Copper Company, Ltd., both underground using open stope mining techniques and at the surface in the form of open pit and sidehill mining. As a result, the mountain fractured and mineral deposits were exposed to oxygen, water and certain bacteria, resulting in acidic mine drainage.

Though mining operations were discontinued in 1963, underground mine workings, waste rock dumps, piles of mine tailings, and an open mine pit still remain at the site.

The mine was designated a Superfund site in 1983 and a water treatment plant was built in 1994. In 2000, the government reached a settlement with Aventis CropScience (now part of Bayer), for the long-term funding of the cleanup efforts. Aventis, formerly known as Rhône-Poulenc, acquired Stauffer Chemical in 1987. Stauffer had purchased Mountain Copper Company in 1968 and in doing so took on the companies liabilities including the cleanup.

Location and drainage

The mine area is drained by several creeks which ultimately enter the Spring Creek Reservoir, formed by the Spring Creek Dam, and finally the Keswick Reservoir formed by a dam across the Sacramento River.

Historic mining activity at the site has fractured the mountain, exposing minerals in the mountain to surface water, rain water, and oxygen. When pyrite is exposed to moisture and oxygen, sulfuric acid forms. This sulfuric acid runs through the mountain and leaches out copper, cadmium, zinc, and other heavy metals. This acid flows out of the seeps and portals of the mine. Much of the acidic mine drainage ultimately is channeled into the Spring Creek Reservoir by creeks surrounding the mine. The Bureau of Reclamation periodically releases the stored acid mine drainage into Keswick Reservoir. Planned releases are timed to coincide with the presence of diluting releases of water from Shasta Dam. On occasion, uncontrolled spills and excessive waste releases have occurred when Spring Creek Reservoir reached capacity. Without sufficient dilution, this results in the release of harmful quantities of heavy metals into the Sacramento River. Approximately 70,000 people use surface water within 3 miles as their source of drinking water. The low pH level and the heavy metal contamination from the mine have caused the virtual elimination of aquatic life in sections of Slickrock Creek, Boulder Creek, and Spring Creek.

The drainage water from the Iron Mountain Mine is the most acidic water naturally found on Earth; some samples collected in 1990 and 1991 have been measured to have a pH value of -3.6. Water temperatures as high as 47 °C have been measured underground.

The drainage water endangers fish, including winter-run Chinook salmon, a federally listed endangered species that spawns in the Sacramento River. Salmon kills have been noted since 1899.

The mine opening contains huge stalactite-stalagmite structures that span from floor to ceiling and are composed of rhomboclase and other iron sulfate minerals.

Bacteria and archaea
The bacteria and archaea living in the mine such as Leptospirillum (bacteria) and Ferroplasma (archaea) are of interest because they can survive in this extreme environment, and because their metabolism contributes to the pollution. They form a pink biofilm several millimeters thick that floats on the surface of the hot water with a pH of 0.8. Since the bacteria cannot be isolated and cultured, scientists have performed community sequencing of the DNA of the five dominant species at once, assembling the genomes afterwards. Four new species were identified in this way in 2004. In 2005, the proteins produced by these bacteria were identified; of the 2033 found proteins 572 were unique to this biofilm.  In 2006, Baker identified three novel archaea, the Archaeal Richmond Mine Acidophilic Nanoorganisms.

The bacteria obtain carbon from the air's carbon dioxide and nitrogen from the air's N2 gas. They are aerobes and obtain energy by using oxygen to oxidize ferrous iron dissolved from the iron sulfide rock; in the process they produce sulfuric acid which releases more metals from the rock.
The bacteria belong to the group of acidophilic ferrous iron oxidizers.

See also
List of Superfund sites in California
Acidophiles in acid mine drainage

References

External links
 Information and links about Iron Mountain Mine, from the Toxic Substances Hydrology Program of the USGS
 US EPA Iron Mountain Mine
 Genome News Network

Superfund sites in California
Copper mines in the United States
Gold mines in California
Iron mines in the United States
Silver mines in the United States
Zinc mines in the United States
Geography of Shasta County, California
Surface mines in the United States
Underground mines in the United States
Buildings and structures in Shasta County, California
1860s establishments in California
1963 disestablishments in California
Buildings and structures in Redding, California